Fatemeh Khishvand (known by her Instagram username of Sahar Tabar,; born 16 June 2001), is an Iranian influencer who is known for her supposed use of cosmetic surgery in images of herself posted to Instagram. It was rumored that she had altered her face through as many as fifty plastic surgeries. Tabar was interviewed on Iranian national television in October 2019 after she was arrested on charges including blasphemy and illegally obtaining money. It was reported that Tabar was sentenced to ten years imprisonment in December 2020.

A few days after the publication of the news of her 10-year prison sentence, she announced to reporters about her release. Tabar said: "The judge has agreed to convert the arrest order into a bail order, and I have been released from prison after posting the bail."  Tabar also told reporters that she was acquitted of two charges and that she has file an appeal and is waiting for the final verdict.

Images
Tabar's images on Instagram gathered over 486,000 followers. The images featured distorted facial features that included exaggerated lips and a pointy, turned-up nose. In a 2017 interview with Sputnik News, Tabar explained the images were created primarily using makeup and Photoshop.

With cosmetic procedures limited at that time to rhinoplasty, liposuction, and injectable fillers in her lips. Some of the photos and videos shared with her followers appeared to have been heavily edited to resemble Hollywood star Angelina Jolie, but Tabar denied this intention.

Arrest
On 5 October 2019, Tabar was arrested in Tehran on charges of "blasphemy, instigating violence, illegally acquiring property, violating the national dress code and encouraging young people to commit corruption" according to the Tasnim news agency, which also stated that the arrest was a response to complaints from the public. Her Instagram account was deleted at the time of her arrest. Three days later, three more female Instagram influencers were arrested in Iran: Sahra Afsharian, Sara Shariatmadari and Niloufar Moti'ei.

Iranian television
On the Islamic Republic of Iran Broadcasting Channel 3 (IRIB TV3), it was reported that Tabar faced a prison sentence of between three months and two years on charges of "obtaining money through illegitimate means, and publishing inappropriate and vulgar photographs".

Tabar was introduced as a "zombie" for a pre-trial interview broadcast on 22 October 2019 by IRIB TV2. Although her face was blurred in the broadcast, Tabar stated that she did not look like her Instagram images because they were heavily Photoshopped in an attempt to look like the titular character in Corpse Bride. She told the interviewer that her childhood dream was to become famous, and she had persisted with building her Instagram fame despite the objections of her mother. Tabar admitted that she had not completed high school, and the broadcast claimed that her efforts to gain online fame had prevented her from advancing to higher education.

The IRIB TV2 interview mitigated the charges against Tabar by presenting her as a person with a psychological disorder, who had believed her posts were acceptable because of the encouragement she received from her many Instagram followers. Nonetheless, Tabar later received a ten-year prison sentence.

See also 
 List of people known for extensive body modification

References 

21st-century Iranian women
Iranian prisoners and detainees
Living people
Social media influencers
Year of birth uncertain
2001 births